The FRIGID New York Fringe Festival or FrigidFest is an open and uncensored fringe theatre festival founded in March 2007 jointly by New York's Horse Trade Theater Group and San Francisco’s EXIT Theatre. The first year 29 theatre companies (comprising nearly 250 theatre artists from various countries) performed for more than 2,000 people. The artists are paid 100% of their box office.

See also
 New York International Fringe Festival
 List of theatre festivals

External links
 Official website

References

Fringe festivals in the United States
Festivals established in 2007
2007 establishments in New York (state)